Ted Rooney (born September 22, 1960) is an American actor and educator, known for his role as Morey Dell on Gilmore Girls, neonatologist Dr. Tabash on ER, and John McGarrigle on the HBO series Boardwalk Empire.

Early life and education 
Rooney was born and raised in Portland, Oregon. He is the seventh of nine children. He graduated from Grant High School, where his father, Ed Rooney, was a teacher and basketball coach. Rooney completed his undergraduate degree in theater at Lewis & Clark College and received his MFA in acting at Temple University.

Career 
After college, Rooney played semi-pro basketball in Germany. He lived for six years in New York City pursuing theater, and he lived ten years in Los Angeles continuing with theater pursuits, commercial work and appearances on television. He teaches acting for television in Portland, Oregon.

Filmography

Film

Television

References

Gilmore Girls
Male actors from Portland, Oregon
Temple University alumni
Lewis & Clark College alumni
Living people
1960 births